The Kawai XD-5 is a percussion synthesizer based on the Kawai K4 sample playback (but uses 16-bit 44.1 kHz sample rate as opposed to 32 kHz ) with filter and AM amplifier modulation synthesis architecture.  It is essentially a Kawai K4r with percussion waveforms, plus faster envelopes, gate mode and amplifier to better suit percussion sounds. The XD-5 also features include 32 digital oscillators each capable of using one of 256 available 16-bit waveforms, a digital filter with self resonance and 8 individual outputs.

Expandability
The XD-5 uses expansion cards to allow an increased number of tones to be stored externally.. One card can hold 64 Patches, 16 kit Patches and 16 output patches.

Sounds
Kick, snare, rim, tom, hi hat, cymbals and other assorted percussion sounds as well as 41 Digital Cyclic waveforms.

Notable users
 THD
 Tim Conrardy
 Klangwelt

References

External links 
Text from the original XD-5 sales brochure archived on Audio Playground

Kawai synthesizers
Drum machines